Seven ships of the French navy have borne the name Iphigénie, in honour of Iphigenia.

French ship named Iphigénie 
 , a frigate, lead ship of her class. Captured by Spanish Navy in 1795, she became Ifigenia.
 , a frigate, was ordered as Iphigénie in 1805
 Iphigénie (1810), the British 18-pounder frigate HMS Iphigenia, built in 1805 and  captured in August 1810. She was retaken by the Royal Navy in December 1810.
 , a  frigate, captured by British Navy 1814, becoming HMS Gloire before being sold in 1817.
 , a 60-gun frigate.
  (1881), a first-class cruiser
  (1936), a

See also

Notes and references

Notes

References

Bibliography 
 
 

French Navy ship names